Ryuji Kumita (born 25 January 1967 in Yokohama), better known by his pseudonym "Dragon", is a racing driver and team owner from Japan.

A late starter to motorsport at 46, he mostly competes in Japanese junior formulae, such as the All-Japan Formula 3 Championship and Formula 4 Japan, despite being the CEO of his B-Max Racing Team.

Racing record

Career summary

‡ Team standings.

Complete Macau Grand Prix results

Complete Formula Regional Japanese Championship results 
(key) (Races in bold indicate pole position) (Races in italics indicate fastest lap)

Complete Super Formula Lights results 
(key) (Races in bold indicate pole position) (Races in italics indicate fastest lap)

References

External links
Profile at Driver Database

Japanese racing drivers
1967 births
Living people
Sportspeople from Yokohama
F3 Asian Championship drivers
Formula Regional Japanese Championship drivers

Japanese Formula 3 Championship drivers
Motopark Academy drivers
KCMG drivers
Formula Masters China drivers
Sports car racing team owners
20th-century Japanese people
Japanese F4 Championship drivers
B-Max Racing drivers